Lisa Robinson is a clinician-scientist. She is a University of Toronto professor in the Department of Paediatrics and the Vice Dean Strategy and Operations at the Faculty of Medicine, former Head of the Division of Nephrology at The Hospital for Sick Children, a Senior Scientist at the SickKids Research Institute, and the first-ever Chief Diversity officer for the Faculty of Medicine at University of Toronto.

Education and training 
Robinson is originally from Toronto, Canada. She completed her undergraduate and medical education (1991) at the University of Toronto,  where she was one of two black medical students in her class.

She completed an internal medicine internship at the Toronto General Hospital (1991-1992), and then a pediatrics residency at the Children's Hospital of Western Ontario (1992-1995). In 1995, she became a fellow of The Royal College of Physicians and Surgeons of Canada. She held a fellowship in pediatric nephrology at Duke University, in North Carolina (1995-1999). She  completed  research training in the Departments of Immunology and Medicine at Duke University, as a part of the Pediatric Scientist Development Program.

From 1999 to 2002, she was a clinician-scientist at the Duke University Medical Center. She returned to Toronto in 2002, joining the Hospital for Sick Children as a staff nephrologist  and a scientist-track investigator in inflammation, immunity, injury and repair.

Career

Research 
Robinson's research interests lies in inflammation, with a focus on the pathways underlying white blood cell migration. As a pediatric nephrologist, her clinical interests lie in kidney transplantation and acute kidney injury. She is a Canada Research Chair for leukocyte migration in inflammation and injury.

Science outreach and advocacy for diversity 
In 2006, she founded the Manulife Kids Science program at the Hospital for Sick Children, which provides interactive science outreach to at-risk middle and high school youth (including patients who receive care at the hospital, and youth in remote and/or disadvantaged neighbourhoods in the Greater Toronto Area). 16,000 children have participated in the program  In 2008, she received the Canadian Institutes of Health Research's Synapse Award ($5,000) in recognition of her outreach efforts through the Kids Science Program. In 2014, she founded the Student Advancement Research (StAR) Program, a SickKids summer research program that provides a six-week paid internship (in research and clinical shadowing) for under-represented minority high school students, particularly Black and Indigenous students. 

In 2016, Robinson was appointed the first-ever Chief Diversity Officer at the University of Toronto's Faculty of Medicine. In this role, she promotes diversity and inclusion of faculty and staff across the Faculty of Medicine. She is a faculty mentor in the University of Toronto's Diversity Mentorship Program, and a member of the Black Canadians Admissions Subcommittee.

Awards 

 (2010) Harry Jerome Health Sciences Award from the Black Business & Professional Association

Selected bibliography 

 Patel S, Huang YW, Reheman A, Pluthero FG, Chaturvedi S, Tole S, Liu GY, Li L,  Durocher Y, Ni H, Kahr WA, Robinson LA. "The Cell Motility Modulator Slit2 is a Potent Inhibitor of Platelet Function." Circulation. 2012.
 Petruzziello TN, Yuen DA, Page AV, Patel S, Soltyk A, Matouk CC, Wong D, Tsui AK, Turgeon PJ, Fish JE, Ho JJD, Steer BM, Khajoee V, Tigdi J, Lee WL, Motto DG, Advani A, Gilbert RE, Karumanchi SA, Robinson LA, Tarr PI, Liles WC, Brunton JL, Marsden PA. "The CXCR4/CXCR7/SDF-1 pathway contributes to the pathogenesis of Shiga toxin-associated hemolytic uremic syndrome in humans and mice." The Journal of Clinical Investigation. 2012: 122(2): pp 759–776.
 Frieling M, Williams A, Al Shareef T, Kala G, Teh JC, Langlois V, Allen U, Hebert D, Robinson LA. "Novel Influenza (H1N1) Infection in Pediatric Renal Transplant Recipients: a Single-Center Experience." Pediatric Transplantation. 2012: 16(2):123-130.
 Quinn K, Henriques M, Tabuchi A, Han B, Yang H, Cheng WE, Tole S, Yu H, Luo A, Charbonney E, Tullis E, Lazarus A, Robinson LA, Ni H, Peterson BR, Kuebler WM, Slutsky AS, Zhang H. "Human neutrophil peptides mediate endothelial-monocyte interaction, foam cell formation, and platelet activation." Arteriosclerosis, Thrombosis, and Vascular Biology. 2011: 31: pp 2070–2079.
 Tole S, Durkan AM, Huang Y-W, Liu GY, Leung A, Jones LL, Taylor JA, Robinson LA. "Thromboxane prostanoid receptor stimulation induces shedding of the transmembrane chemokine, CX3CL1, yet enhances CX3CL1-dependent leukocyte adhesion." American Journal of Physiology. Cell Physiology 2010: 298: pp C1469-80.
 Anthony SJ, Hebert D, Todd L, Korus M, Langlois V, Pool R, Robinson LA, Williams A, Pollock-BarZiv S. "Child and parental perspectives of multidimensional quality of life outcomes after kidney transplantation." Pediatric Transplantation. 2010: 14: pp 249–256.
 Tole S, Mukovozov IM, Huang Y-W, Magalhaes MAO, Yan M, Crow MR, Liu GY, Sun CX, Durocher Y, Glogauer M, Robinson LA. "The axonal repellent, Slit2, inhibits directional migration of circulating neutrophils." Journal of Leukocyte Biology. 2009: 86: pp 1403–15.
 Huang Y-W, Su P, Guang YL, Crow MR, Chaukos D, Yan H, Robinson LA. "Constitutive endocytosis of the chemokine, CX3CL1, prevents its degradation by cell surface metalloproteases." Journal of Biological Chemistry. 2009: 284: pp 29644–653.
 Durkan A, Alexander RT, Liu GY, Rui M, Femia G, Robinson LA. "Expression and targeting of CX3CL1 (Fractalkine) in Renal Tubular Epithelial Cells." Journal of the American Society of Nephrology. 2007: 18: pp 74–83.

References 

Year of birth missing (living people)
Living people
Scientists from Toronto
University of Toronto alumni
Academic staff of the University of Toronto
Canadian women physicians
Canadian nephrologists
Canadian pediatricians
Women pediatricians